Decia may refer to :

 Decia gens, an ancient Roman family
 the Ancient city and bishopric Mopsuestia
 in Latin, feminine form of decius (the) 'tenth'